Hopea siamensis is a species of plant in the family Dipterocarpaceae. It is a tree found in Cambodia, Thailand, and Vietnam. It is a critically endangered species threatened by habitat loss.

References

siamensis
Trees of Cambodia
Trees of Thailand
Trees of Vietnam
Flora of Indo-China
Critically endangered flora of Asia
Taxonomy articles created by Polbot